The 2001 Sam Houston State Bearkats football team represented Sam Houston State University as a member of the Southland Football League during the 2001 NCAA Division I-AA football season. Led by 20th-year head coach Ron Randleman, the Bearkats compiled and overall record of 10–3 with a mark of 5–1 in conference play, sharing the Southland title with McNeese State. Sam Houston State advanced to the NCAA Division I-AA Football Championship playoffs, where they beat Northern Arizona in the first round before losing to the eventual national champion, Montana, in the quarterfinals. The 2001 Bearkats offense scored 470 points while the defense allowed 322 points. Members of the 2001 Bearkats team that went on to play in the National Football League (NFL) include Keith Davis, Keith Heinrich, and Josh McCown.

Schedule

References

Sam Houston
Sam Houston Bearkats football seasons
Southland Conference football champion seasons
Sam Houston State Bearkats football